Tara Deshpande is an Indian actress, writer, former model and MTV VJ. Tara hosted a show called Kab Kyon Kahaan on Zee TV, along with Parth and then with Vinay Jain in the early 1990s. She appeared in several acclaimed films such as Sudhir Mishra's Is Raat Ki Subah Nahin and Kaizad Gustad's Bombay Boys. Since her marriage to an American citizen and moving to Boston in 2001, she lives in the Boston area where she currently runs a catering agency. Her husband is a graduate of Harvard Business School and is in finance. Tara published her first book at the age of 23, Fifty and Done (HarperCollins). Before entering the world of movies she was a model and MTV VJ and a regular on the Mumbai stage. She played Begum Sumroo in Alyque Padamsee's play of the same name. Her book, A Sense for Spice: Recipes and Stories from a Konkan Kitchen (Westland Publishers) was published in 2012 and Indian Sense of Salad in 2018. She travels between NYC and Mumbai.

Filmography

Feature films 
Is Raat Ki Subah Nahin (1996)
Bada Din (1998)
Bombay Boys (1998)
Tapish (2000)
Style (2001)
Encounter: The Killing (2002)
Danger (2002)

References

External links

Indian film actresses
Year of birth missing (living people)
Living people
Actresses in Hindi cinema
Actresses from Mumbai
Female models from Mumbai